Dario Ortiz may refer to:

 Dario Ortiz (artist) (born 1968), Colombian artist
 Darío Ortiz (footballer) (born 1967), Argentine footballer